Yevgeny Nikolayevich Kotlov (16 December 1949 – 11 January 2016) was a Soviet hockey player.

His hockey career began in 1963. Known for his performances in clubs Traktor Chelyabinsk (1967–70) and HC Dynamo Moscow (1970–79). He played for the youth team of the USSR and the second. At the end of his playing career, working children and youth coach. He died in Moscow in 2016.

References

External links
 Евгений Николаевич Котлов, www.dynamo-history.ru
  Умер экс-хоккеист «Динамо» Евгений Котлов

1949 births
2016 deaths
Sportspeople from Chelyabinsk
Soviet ice hockey players
Traktor Chelyabinsk players
HC Dynamo Moscow players